Hendrik Boshoff (born 2 August 1958) is a South African cricketer. He played in one first-class match for Eastern Province in 1981/82.

See also
 List of Eastern Province representative cricketers

References

External links
 

1958 births
Living people
South African cricketers
Eastern Province cricketers
People from Kroonstad